Channa bleheri (the rainbow snakehead) is a species of dwarf snakehead that is endemic to the Brahmaputra River basin in the Indian states of Assam and Arunachal Pradesh. It is among the most colorful species of snakehead.

Distribution and etymology
In the wild, this species primarily inhabits waters within the Indian state of Assam, and it is known in Assamese as sengeli or chengeli.  Its binomial name honors the explorer Heiko Bleher. The specific name of this fish honours the explorer and exotic fish trader Heiko Bleher who assisted in the collection of the type and gave it to Vierke.

Endemic to the Brahmaputra River basin, this fish has a type location at Dibrugarh, a city in the northeastern part of Assam.  Its closest relative appears to be Channa burmanica, which is endemic to northern Burma.

Appearance and aquarium popularity
This species is one of the favorite snakeheads for aquariums because of the colors that inspired its common name. Juveniles that have reached  have yellow bodies, and adults have large orange or red spots.

Reproduction and movement

Among dwarf snakeheads, it is the only nestbrooder; all others are mouthbrooders. Females, which are smaller than males, appear to initiate courtship, although the male selects the nesting site, and both parents will guard the larvae.

The adult male and female move near the surface for sex. These fish are benthopelagic, meaning that they mostly dwell near the bottom of bodies of water.

Environmental and legal issues
The federal government in the U.S. is concerned that release of this fish into U.S. waters could harm the environment. This predator could kill native species, especially in southern areas such as Florida, Texas, and Hawaii that have a warm climate similar to Assam's climate.

Accordingly, it is illegal in the United States to possess, import, or sell these fish or their eggs.  Violations of this law have occurred in various states (e.g. Kentucky and Georgia).

References

External links

 snakeheads.org

bleheri
Fish of Bangladesh
Fish of India
Taxa named by Jörg Vierke
Fish described in 1991